Gelston may refer to:

Gelston, Dumfries and Galloway, a hamlet in Scotland
Gelston, Lincolnshire, a village in England
David Gelston (1744–1828), an American merchant and politician
Gelston Castle in Jordanville, New York, in the United States
Gelston Castle, a listed building in Kelton, Dumfries and Galloway, in Scotland